Elections were held in the organized municipalities in the Algoma District of Ontario on October 22, 2018 in conjunction with municipal elections across the province.

Blind River

Mayor

Bruce Mines

Mayor

Dubreuilville

Mayor

Elliot Lake

Mayor

Hilton

Mayor

Hilton Beach

Mayor

Hornepayne

Mayor

Huron Shores

Mayor

Jocelyn

Mayor

Johnson

Mayor

Laird

Mayor

Macdonald, Meredith and Aberdeen Additional

Mayor

North Shore, The

Mayor

2020 mayoral by-election
A mayoral by-election was held on September 14, 2020 due to the resignation of Condie.

Plummer Additional

Mayor

Prince

Mayor

Sault Ste. Marie
List of candidates:

Mayor

Sault Ste. Marie City Council

Two elected per ward.

City council has been reduced in size from 12 members to 10 members (plus the mayor).

Spanish

Mayor

St. Joseph

Mayor

Tarbutt

Mayor

Thessalon

Mayor

Wawa

Mayor

White River

Mayor

References

Algoma
Algoma District